The 123rd Fighter Escadrille of the Polish Air Force (Polish: 123. eskadra myśliwska) was one of the fighter units of the Polish Army in 1939.

History

In September 1939 the 123rd Fighter Escadrille was part of the Pursuit Brigade.
Some reports say that the 123rd Escadrille was a Kraków Army "Eskadra" (Flight) attached to the Brygada Poscigowa for the defence of Warsaw in 1939. Its 120 series Flight number indicates that claim.
Reference: "Ciel de Gloire" website.

Crew and equipment

On 1 September 1939 the escadrille had 10 PZL P.7a airplanes.

The air crew consisted of: 
commanding officer kpt. pil. Mieczysław Leonard Olszewski
his deputy ppor. pil. Erwin Kawnik 
and 11 other pilots:

 ppor. Stanisław Chałupa
 ppor. Jerzy Czerniak
 ppor. Feliks Szyszka
 pchor. Władysław Bożek
 pchor. Stanisław Czternastek
 pchor. Antoni Danek
 pchor. Tadeusz Kratke
 kpr. Henryk Flame
 kpr. Stanisław Widlarz
 st. szer. Eugeniusz Nowakiewicz
 st. szer. Stanisław Zięba

See also
Polish Air Force order of battle in 1939

Polish Air Force escadrilles